Mansat-la-Courrière is a commune in the Creuse department in the Nouvelle-Aquitaine region in central France.

Geography

Population

Sights
 The church of St. Martial, dating from the twelfth century.
 The fifteenth-century castle.
 Traces of a Roman villa.
 A bronze statue of the Graeco-Roman god Apollo was unearthed here and is now in the Louvre museum.

See also
Communes of the Creuse department

References

Communes of Creuse